The 1980 Hawaii Rainbow Warriors baseball team represented the University of Hawaii at Manoa during the 1980 NCAA Division I baseball season. It was the program's 58th season of existence, and their first season in the Western Athletic Conference. In the Warriors' first season in the WAC, they won divisional and conference honors, winning the South Division regular season, and the WAC Championship Series against BYU. The Rainbow Warriors received an automatic berth into the 1980 NCAA Division I baseball tournament. There, they won the Central Regional and advanced to the College World Series, where they lost in the final to Arizona.

Background 

The 1979 season saw the Rainbow Warriors finish with an overall record of 69-15, including notable wins over Vanderbilt, North Carolina, and Oregon State. Their record provided the Warriors with an at-large berth into the 1979 NCAA Division I baseball tournament. The Warriors lost in the midwest regional final to Arizona.

Roster

Schedule 

! style="background:#02452f;color:white;"| Regular season
|- valign="top" 

|- align="center" bgcolor="#ddffdd"
|- align=center bgcolor="#ddffdd"
| February 1 || at UH-Hilo || Francis Wong Stadium • Hilo, HI || W 6–2 || 1–0 || —
|- align=center bgcolor="#ddffdd"
| February 1 || at UH-Hilo || Francis Wong Stadium • Hilo, HI || W 8–5 || 2–0 || —
|- align=center bgcolor="#ddffdd"
| February 2 || at UH-Hilo || Francis Wong Stadium • Hilo, HI || W 15–1 || 3–0 || —
|- align=center bgcolor="#ddffdd"
| February 3 || UH-Hilo || UH Stadium • Honolulu, HI || W 9–0 || 4–0 || —
|- align=center bgcolor="#ddffdd"
| February 3 || UH-Hilo || UH Stadium • Honolulu, HI || W 7–3 || 5–0 || —
|- align=center bgcolor="#ddffdd"
| February 9 || UH-Hilo || UH Stadium • Honolulu, HI || W 10–3 || 6–0 || —
|- align=center bgcolor="#ddffdd"
|February 10 || UH-Hilo  || UH Stadium • Honolulu, HI || W 7–1 || 7–0 || —
|- align=center bgcolor="#ddffdd"
|February 10 || UH-Hilo  || UH Stadium • Honolulu, HI || W 13–2 || 8–0 || —
|- align=center bgcolor="#ffdddd"
|February 15 || Arizona State || UH Stadium • Honolulu, HI || L 11–13 || 8–1 || —
|- align=center bgcolor="#ddffdd"
|February 15 || Arizona State || UH Stadium • Honolulu, HI || W 8–7 || 9–1 || —
|- align=center bgcolor="#ddffdd"
|February 16 || Arizona State || UH Stadium • Honolulu, HI || W 8–6 || 10–1 || —
|- align=center bgcolor="#ddffdd"
|February 16 || Arizona State || UH Stadium • Honolulu, HI || W 13–2 || 11–1 || —
|- align=center bgcolor="#ffdddd"
|February 17 || Arizona State || UH Stadium • Honolulu, HI || L 11–13 || 11–2 || —
|- align=center bgcolor="#ddffdd"
|February 17 || Arizona State || UH Stadium • Honolulu, HI || W 4–2 || 12–2 || —
|- align=center bgcolor="#ddffdd"
|February 29 || Oklahoma || UH Stadium • Honolulu, HI || W 3–2 || 13–2 || —
|-

|- align="center" bgcolor="#ffdddd"
| March 1 || Oklahoma || UH Stadium • Honolulu, HI || L 1–2 || 13–3 || —
|- align="center" bgcolor="#ddffdd"
| March 1 || Oklahoma || UH Stadium • Honolulu, HI || W 11–1 || 14–3 || —
|- align="center" bgcolor="#ffdddd"
| March 2 || Oklahoma || UH Stadium • Honolulu, HI || L 0–1 || 14–4 || —
|- align="center" bgcolor="#ddffdd"
| March 2 || Oklahoma || UH Stadium • Honolulu, HI || W 8–7 || 15–4 || —
|- align="center" bgcolor="#ffdddd"
| March 3 || Oklahoma  || UH Stadium • Honolulu, HI || L 5–6 || 15–5 || —
|- align="center" bgcolor="#ddffdd"
| March 7 || Murray State || UH Stadium • Honolulu, HI || W 7–6 || 16–5 || —
|- align="center" bgcolor="#ddffdd"
| March 7 || Murray State || UH Stadium • Honolulu, HI || W 16–7 || 17–5 || —
|- align="center" bgcolor="#ddffdd"
| March 8 || Murray State || UH Stadium • Honolulu, HI || W 6–0 || 18–5 || —
|- align="center" bgcolor="#ddffdd"
| March 8 || Murray State || UH Stadium • Honolulu, HI || W 12–6 || 19–5 || —
|- align="center" bgcolor="#ddffdd"
| March 9 || Murray State || UH Stadium • Honolulu, HI || W 7–3 || 20–5 || —
|- align="center" bgcolor="#ffdddd"
| March 10 || Wichita State || UH Stadium • Honolulu, HI || L 2–6 || 20–6 || —
|- align="center" bgcolor="#ffdddd"
| March 12 || Wichita State || UH Stadium • Honolulu, HI || L 1–6 || 20–7 || —
|- align="center" bgcolor="#ffdddd"
| March 12 || Wichita State || UH Stadium • Honolulu, HI || L 8–9 || 20–8 || —
|- align="center" bgcolor="#ddffdd"
| March 13 || Wichita State || UH Stadium • Honolulu, HI || W 7–3 || 21–8 || —
|- align="center" bgcolor="#ddffdd"
| March 18 || Kearney State || UH Stadium • Honolulu, HI || W 9–0 || 22–8 || —
|- align="center" bgcolor="#ddffdd"
| March 18 || Kearney State || UH Stadium • Honolulu, HI || W 11–0 || 23–8 || —
|- align="center" bgcolor="#ddffdd"
| March 21 || Cal State Los Angeles || UH Stadium • Honolulu, HI || W 6–1 || 24–8 || —
|- align="center" bgcolor="#ddffdd"
| March 22 || Cal State Los Angeles || UH Stadium • Honolulu, HI || W 8–3 || 25–8 || —
|- align="center"  bgcolor="#ddffdd"
| March 24 || Missouri || UH Stadium • Honolulu, HI || W 6–2 || 26–8 || —
|- align="center"  bgcolor="#ddffdd"
| March 25 || Chuo || UH Stadium • Honolulu, HI || W 5–3 || 27–8 || —
|- align="center" bgcolor="#ddffdd"
| March 26 || Cal Poly Pomona || UH Stadium • Honolulu, HI || W 10–7 || 28–8 || —
|- align="center" bgcolor="#ddffdd"
| March 27 || Cal Poly Pomona || UH Stadium • Honolulu, HI || W 6–0  || 29–8 || —
|- align="center" bgcolor="#ddffdd"
| March 27 || Chuo || UH Stadium • Honolulu, HI || W 14–5 || 30–8 || —
|- align="center" bgcolor="#ffdddd"
| March 28 || Missouri || UH Stadium • Honolulu, HI || L 2–10 || 30–9 || —
|-

|- align="center" bgcolor="#ddffdd"
| April 4 || at UTEP || Dudley Field • El Paso, TX || W 15–8 || 31–9 || 1–0
|- align="center" bgcolor="#ddffdd"
| April 4 || at UTEP || Dudley Field • El Paso, TX || W 10–6 || 32–9 || 2–0
|- align="center" bgcolor="#ddffdd"
| April 5 || at UTEP || Dudley Field • El Paso, TX || W 12–8 || 33–9 || 3–0
|- align="center" bgcolor="#ddffdd"
| April 5 || at UTEP || Dudley Field • El Paso, TX || W 12–4 || 34–9 || 4–0
|- align="center" bgcolor="#ddffdd"
| April 7 || at Wichita State || Shocker Field • Wichita, KS || W 9–1 || 35–9 || —
|- align="center" bgcolor="#ddffdd"
| April 8 || at Wichita State || Shocker Field • Wichita, KS || W 12–6 || 36–9 || —
|- align="center" bgcolor="#ddffdd"
| April 10 || at New Mexico || UNM Ballpark • Albuquerque, NM || W 6–1 || 37–9 || 5–0
|- align="center" bgcolor="#ddffdd"
| April 10 || at New Mexico || UNM Ballpark • Albuquerque, NM || W 13–11 || 38–9 || 6–0
|- align="center" bgcolor="#ffdddd"
| April 11 || at New Mexico || UNM Ballpark • Albuquerque, NM || L 0–14 || 38–10 || 6–1
|- align="center" bgcolor="#ffdddd"
| April 11 || at New Mexico || UNM Ballpark • Albuquerque, NM || L 6–11 || 38–11 || 6–2
|- align="center" bgcolor="#ddffdd"
| April 17 || San Diego State || UH Stadium • Honolulu, HI || W 7–4 || 39–11 || 7–2
|- align="center" bgcolor="#ddffdd"
| April 18 || San Diego State || UH Stadium • Honolulu, HI || W 11–4 || 40–11 || 8–2
|- align="center" bgcolor="#ddffdd"
| April 19 || San Diego State || UH Stadium • Honolulu, HI || W 6–5 || 41–11 || 9–2
|- align="center" bgcolor="#ddffdd"
| April 19 || San Diego State || UH Stadium • Honolulu, HI || W 7–4 || 42–11 || 10–2
|- align="center" bgcolor="#ffdddd"
| April 20 || San Diego State || UH Stadium • Honolulu, HI || L 4–9 || 42–12 || 10–3
|- align="center" bgcolor="#ddffdd"
| April 24 || UTEP || UH Stadium • Honolulu, HI || W 9–4 || 43–12 || 11–3
|- align="center" bgcolor="#ddffdd"
| April 25 || UTEP || UH Stadium • Honolulu, HI || W 10–2 || 44–12 || 12–3
|- align="center" bgcolor="#ddffdd"
| April 25 || UTEP || UH Stadium • Honolulu, HI || W 7–1 || 45–12 || 13–3
|- align="center" bgcolor="#ddffdd"
| April 26 || UTEP || UH Stadium • Honolulu, HI || W 9–0 || 46–12 || 14–3
|- align="center" bgcolor="#ddffdd"
| April 26 || UTEP || UH Stadium • Honolulu, HI || W 7–6 || 47–12 || 15–3
|- align="center" bgcolor="#ffdddd"
| April 27 || UTEP || UH Stadium • Honolulu, HI || L 1–10 || 47–13 || 15–4
|-

|- align="center" bgcolor="#ddffdd"
| May 2 || at San Diego State || SDSU Ballpark • San Diego, CA || W 7–1 || 48–13 || 16–4
|- align="center" bgcolor="#ffdddd"
| May 2 || at San Diego State || SDSU Ballpark • San Diego, CA || L 2–3 || 48–14 || 16–5
|- align="center" bgcolor="#ffdddd"
| May 3 || at San Diego State || SDSU Ballpark • San Diego, CA || L 5–8 || 48–15 || —
|- align="center" bgcolor="#ddffdd"
| May 3 || at San Diego State || SDSU Ballpark • San Diego, CA || W 9–3 || 49–15 || —
|- align="center" bgcolor="#ddffdd"
| May 7 || New Mexico || UH Stadium • Honolulu, HI || W 8–7 || 50–15 || —
|- align="center" bgcolor="#ffdddd"
| May 8 || New Mexico || UH Stadium • Honolulu, HI || L 1–4 || 50–16 || —
|- align="center" bgcolor="#ddffdd"
| May 8 || New Mexico || UH Stadium • Honolulu, HI || W 11–10 || 51–16 || —
|- align="center" bgcolor="#ddffdd"
| May 9 || New Mexico || UH Stadium • Honolulu, HI || W 9–0 || 52–17 || 17–5
|- align="center" bgcolor="#ddffdd"
| May 9 || New Mexico || UH Stadium • Honolulu, HI || W 4–3 || 53–17 || 18–5
|- align="center" bgcolor="#ddffdd"
| May 10 || New Mexico || UH Stadium • Honolulu, HI || W 4–2 || 54–17 || 19–5
|-

|-
! style="background:#02452f;color:white;"| Postseason
|- valign="top"

|- align="center" bgcolor="#ddffdd"
| May 16 || BYU || UH Stadium • Honolulu, HI || W 9–2 || 55–17 || 1–0
|- align="center" bgcolor="#ddffdd"
| May 17 || BYU || UH Stadium • Honolulu, HI || W 7–0 || 56–17 || 2–0
|-

|- align="center" bgcolor="#ddffdd"
| May 23 || vs. Texas–Pan American || Disch–Falk Field • Austin, TX || W 8–4 || 57–17 || 3–0
|- align="center" bgcolor="#ddffdd"
| May 24 || vs. Louisiana Tech || Disch–Falk Field • Austin, TX || W 2–1 || 58–17 || 4–0
|- align="center" bgcolor="#ddffdd"
| May 25 || at Texas || Disch–Falk Field • Austin, TX || W 7–3 || 59–17 || 5–0
|-

|- align="center" bgcolor="#ddffdd"
| May 30 || vs. Florida State || Johnny Rosenblatt Stadium • Omaha, NE || W 7–6 || 60–17 || 6–0
|- align="center" bgcolor="#ddffdd"
| June 1 || vs. St. John's || Johnny Rosenblatt Stadium • Omaha, NE || W 7–6 || 61–17 || 7–0
|- align="center" bgcolor="#ddffdd"
| June 3 || vs. Miami || Johnny Rosenblatt Stadium • Omaha, NE || W 9–3 || 62–17 || 8–0
|- align="center" bgcolor="#ffdddd"
| June 4 || vs. Arizona || Johnny Rosenblatt Stadium • Omaha, NE || L 4–5 || 62–18 || 8–1
|- align="center" bgcolor="#ffdddd"
| June 5 || vs. Arizona || Johnny Rosenblatt Stadium • Omaha, NE || L 3–5 || 62–19 || 8–2
|-

Warriors in the 1980 MLB Draft 
The following members of the Hawaii Rainbow Warriors baseball program were drafted in the 1980 Major League Baseball Draft.

References

External links 
 WAC Record Book 
 UH Manoa Baseball Record Book

Hawaii
Hawaii Rainbow Warriors baseball seasons
College World Series seasons
Western Athletic Conference baseball champion seasons
1980 in sports in Hawaii